David John House was a historic home located at Lexington, Lafayette County, Missouri.  It was built about 1848, and is a one-story, double-pen plan red brick dwelling with Greek Revival style detailing. It had historic frame additions and featured two frame porches with distinctive cut-out posts and scrollwork railings added in the 1870s-1880s.  Also on the property was the contributing privy.  It is no longer in existence.

It was listed on the National Register of Historic Places in 1993.

References

Houses on the National Register of Historic Places in Missouri
Greek Revival houses in Missouri
Houses completed in 1848
Houses in Lafayette County, Missouri
National Register of Historic Places in Lafayette County, Missouri